Karin Knapp (born 28 June 1987) is a retired Italian tennis player.

In her career, Knapp won two singles titles on the WTA Tour, as well as six singles titles and six doubles titles on the ITF Circuit. On 24 August 2015, she reached her best singles ranking of world No. 33. On 28 September 2015, she peaked at No. 49 in the doubles rankings.

As a member of the Italy Fed Cup team, Knapp was part of the winning squad in 2013 and has a win–loss record of 3–3.

Personal life
Knapp was born 1987 in the northern Italian province of South Tyrol. Her father, Alois, is a fabric manufacturer and her mother, Marianne, is a retired school teacher. She has two brothers, Stefan and Michael. Knapp was introduced to tennis at age seven by her parents. She admires Kim Clijsters.

Career

2007
At the French Open, her first Grand Slam tournament, she reached the third round in the singles event, beating 22nd-seeded Alona Bondarenko. In the third round, she lost to 14th-seeded Patty Schnyder.

At the US Open, she defeated Chan Yung-jan to reach the second round where she lost to American wildcard Ahsha Rolle. Her biggest ITF final came in 2007 in Biella, where she was beaten by Agnieszka Radwańska.

2008
Knapp reached her first WTA Tour final in 2008 in Antwerp. She lost there to world No. 1 and home favorite, Justine Henin. At the 2008 French Open, she lost in the third round to top-seeded Maria Sharapova.

2012
Knapp started season off at the Brisbane International. She was defeated in the second round of qualifying by Vera Dushevina. At the Hobart International, Knapp lost in the first round of qualifying to Irina Falconi. In Melbourne at the Australian Open, she was defeated in the second round of qualifying by Kurumi Nara.

2013

Knapp began the year at the Brisbane International where she lost in the second round of qualifying to Australian wildcard Bojana Bobusic. At the Apia International Sydney, Knapp was defeated in the first round of qualifying by Alexa Glatch. After qualifying for the Australian Open, she lost in the first round to fellow qualifier Maria João Koehler.

After that, Knapp traveled to Paris to play at the Open GdF Suez where she was defeated in the first round of qualifying to Garbiñe Muguruza. In Bogotá at the Copa Colsanitas, Knapp made it to the semifinals defeating Eva Birnerová, Lourdes Domínguez Lino, and Lara Arruabarrena Vecino. She lost in her semifinal match to top seed and eventual champion Jelena Janković. At the Abierto Mexicano Telcel, Knapp was defeated in her quarterfinal match by Sílvia Soler Espinosa.

Knapp began her clay-court season at the Rabat Grand Prix. Despite qualifying for the main draw, she lost in the second round to third seed Alizé Cornet. At the Portugal Open, Knapp was defeated in the first round of qualifying by Shahar Pe'er. Seeded second in Trnava at the Slovak Open, Knapp reached the final where she lost to Barbora Záhlavová-Strýcová. Knapp played her final tournament before the French Open at the Italian Open. She was defeated in the first round by Christina McHale. At the French Open, Knapp lost in the first round to 17th seed Sloane Stephens. After the French Open, Knapp competed at the first edition of the Nürnberger Versicherungscup. She was defeated in the second round by eighth seed Annika Beck.

Knapp only played one grass-court tournament in the leadup to Wimbledon. At the Aegon International, she lost in the first round of qualifying to Melanie Oudin. Knapp earned her best Grand Slam result at the Wimbledon Championships. She made it to the fourth round beating Lucie Hradecká, 27th seed Lucie Šafářová, and qualifier Michelle Larcher de Brito. She was defeated in her fourth-round match by 15th seed and eventual champion, Marion Bartoli.

After Wimbledon, Knapp competed at the Internazionali di Palermo. She lost in the second round to fourth seed Klára Zakopalová. Seeded eighth at the Gastein Ladies, Knapp reached the semifinal round where she was defeated by eventual champion Yvonne Meusburger.

Despite qualifying for the Western & Southern Open, Knapp lost in the first round to ninth seed Angelique Kerber. Knapp played her final tournament before the US Open at the New Haven Open. She successfully qualified for the main draw; she was defeated in the second round by fourth seed Caroline Wozniacki. Ranked 55 at the US Open, Knapp reached the third round after wins over American qualifier Grace Min and 22nd seed Elena Vesnina. She lost in the third round to tenth seed Roberta Vinci.

In Austria at the Generali Ladies Linz, Knapp upset eighth seed Daniela Hantuchová in her first-round match. In the second round, she was defeated by Stefanie Vögele. Knapp's final tournament of the season was at the Luxembourg Open. She reached the quarterfinals where she lost to third seed Sabine Lisicki.

Knapp ended the year ranked 41.

2014: First WTA title

Knapp began the season at the ASB Classic. Seeded eighth, she was defeated in the first round by Julia Görges. At the Hobart International, Knapp lost in the first round to qualifier Estrella Cabeza Candela. Ranked 44 at the Australian Open, she beat Paula Ormaechea in the first round. In the second round, she faced third seed Maria Sharapova. Knapp took Sharapova to three sets, but she ended up losing the three hour and 28 minute match.

In Paris at the Open GdF Suez, Knapp lost in the second round to third seed, last year finalist, and eventual finalist Sara Errani. Playing in the Fed Cup tie versus the USA, Knapp won both of her rubbers over Christina McHale and Alison Riske. Italy won the tie 3-1 to advance to the semifinal round. At the Qatar Open in Doha, Knapp beat Caroline Garcia in the first round. She was defeated in the second round by fifth seed Jelena Janković. Knapp lost in the second round of qualifying at the Dubai Championships to Annika Beck. In Indian Wells at the BNP Paribas Open, Knapp was defeated in round one by American wildcard Taylor Townsend. At the Sony Open in Miami, Knapp lost in the first round to qualifier Patricia Mayr-Achleitner. Seeded seventh at the Monterrey Open, Knapp was defeated in the first round by eventual finalist Jovana Jakšić.

Knapp started her clay-court season at the Copa Colsanitas. Seeded third, she lost in the first round to Chanelle Scheepers. In Estoril at the Portugal Open, Knapp was defeated in the first round by Yaroslava Shvedova. At the Madrid Open, Knapp lost in the first round to Bojana Jovanovski. In Rome at the Italian Open, Knapp was defeated in the first round by 11th seed Ana Ivanovic. Knapp played her final tournament before the French Open at the Nürnberger Versicherungscup. She advanced to the semifinals after wins over Shahar Pe'er, Polona Hercog, and seventh seed Caroline Garcia. She lost in her semifinal match to second seed and eventual champion Eugenie Bouchard. Ranked 49 at the French Open, Knapp was defeated in the first round by Mona Barthel.

After skipping the Aegon Classic and the Topshelf Open, Knapp returned to action at the Wimbledon Championships. She lost in a three-set thriller in the first round to Karolína Plíšková.

As the top seed at the Reinert Open, a $50k tournament in Germany, Knapp was defeated in the first round by qualifier Verónica Cepede Royg. Seeded fourth at the first edition of the Bucharest Open, Knapp lost in the second round to Danka Kovinić. At the İstanbul Cup, Knapp was defeated in the second round by top seed and eventual champion Caroline Wozniacki.

Qualifying for the Rogers Cup, Knapp lost in round one to Caroline Garcia. Even though Knapp qualified for the Western & Southern Open, she was defeated in the second round by Anastasia Pavlyuchenkova. Knapp fell in the final round of qualifying at the Connecticut Open to Peng Shuai. Ranked seventy-one at the US Open, Knapp lost in the first round to Tsvetana Pironkova.

Seeded third at the Tashkent Open, Knapp reached the final after victories over Çağla Büyükakçay, Aliaksandra Sasnovich, Olga Govortsova, and qualifier Lesia Tsurenko. She beat top seed and defending champion Bojana Jovanovski in the final to win her first WTA title. At the Guangzhou International Open, Knapp was defeated in the first round by Monica Puig. Qualifying for the first edition of the Wuhan Open, Knapp lost in the second round to third seed and eventual champion Petra Kvitová. In Austria at the Generali Ladies Linz, Knapp advanced to the semifinals after wins over fifth seed Sabine Lisicki, Magdaléna Rybáriková, and Tsvetana Pironkova. She was defeated in her semifinal match by compatriot Camila Giorgi. Knapp's final tournament of the year was at the Luxembourg Open. She faced Patricia Mayr-Achleitner in her first-round match. Knapp retired leading 3-2 in the first set due to a left thigh injury.

Knapp ended the year ranked 56.

2015

Knapp started her 2015 season off at the Shenzhen Open. After winning her first-round match, she was defeated in the second round by eighth seed and eventual finalist Timea Bacsinszky. In the Hobart International, Knapp reached the quarterfinals after beating Ajla Tomljanović and top seed Casey Dellacqua. She lost her quarterfinal match to qualifier and eventual finalist Madison Brengle. Ranked 50 at the Australian Open, Knapp was defeated in the first round by third seed Simona Halep.

Competing in Antwerp, Belgium at the Diamond Games, Knapp was defeated in her first-round match by Annika Beck. At the Dubai Championships, Knapp lost in the first round to Belinda Bencic. In Monterrey, Knapp was defeated in the first round by third seed and eventual finalist Caroline Garcia. At the Indian Wells Open, Knapp lost in the first round to Yanina Wickmayer. At the Miami Open, Knapp was defeated in the second round by eighth seed Ekaterina Makarova. Seeded sixth at the Katowice Open, Knapp lost in the first round to Vera Zvonareva.

Knapp began her clay-court season at the Morocco Open. She reached the quarterfinals defeating Çağla Büyükakçay and sixth seed Roberta Vinci. She was defeated in her quarterfinal match by fourth seed and eventual champion Elina Svitolina. Playing in Rome at the Italian Open, Knapp scored a first-round victory over compatriot Francesca Schiavone. She lost in the second round to fourth seed Petra Kvitová. Seeded sixth at the Nürnberger Versicherungscup, Knapp reached the final defeating Antonia Lottner, Anna-Lena Friedsam, qualifier Yulia Putintseva, and Lara Arruabarrena. In the final, she beat fourth seed Roberta Vinci to win her second WTA title. Ranked forty-two at the French Open, Knapp was defeated in the first round by fifth seed Caroline Wozniacki.

Knapp began her grass-court season at the first edition of the Nottingham Open. Seeded fourth, she lost in the first round to Yanina Wickmayer. In Birmingham at the Aegon Classic, Knapp was defeated in the first round by 13th seed Svetlana Kuznetsova. At the Wimbledon Championships, Knapp retired in the second set during her first-round match against Magdaléna Rybáriková.

Seeded third at the Gastein Ladies, Knapp made it to the final after victories over Tamira Paszek, Johanna Larsson, Polona Hercog, and top seed Sara Errani. In the final, she lost to second seed Sam Stosur. Seeded second at the Baku Cup, Knapp was defeated in the semifinals by Margarita Gasparyan.

In Toronto at the Rogers Cup, Knapp lost in the first round to Roberta Vinci; this was the worst loss of her career. At the Western & Southern Open, Knapp was defeated in the third round by top seed, defending champion, and eventual champion Serena Williams. Ranked 34 at the US Open, Knapp lost in the second round to 11th seed Angelique Kerber.

Knapp was forced to end the season early due to a knee injury. She ended the year ranked 51.

2016

Knapp returned to action in March at the Miami Open. She lost in the first round to Yanina Wickmayer. In Poland at the Katowice Open, Knapp was defeated in the first round by Naomi Broady.

Knapp began clay-court season at the İstanbul Cup. She lost in the first round to Hsieh Su-wei. In Spain at the Madrid Open, Knapp was defeated in the second round by sixth seed and eventual champion Simona Halep. At the Italian Open, Knapp lost in round one to Barbora Strýcová. Knapp had a lucky run at the French Open. In the first round, she faced fifth seed Victoria Azarenka and won the match when Azarenka retired during the third set due to a right knee injury. Then, she beat Anastasija Sevastova to reach the third round for the first time since 2008. She was defeated in the third round by Yulia Putintseva.

As the top seed at the Internazionali di Brescia, a $50k tournament, Knapp won the title beating Jesika Malečková in the final.

Ranked 90 at the Wimbledon Championships, Knapp lost in the first round to Ana Konjuh.

At the Swedish Open, Knapp was defeated in the quarterfinals by Julia Görges. Knapp retired during her second-round match against Rebecca Peterson at the Prague Open. In August, Knapp represented Italy at the Rio Olympics. She lost in the first round to Lucie Šafářová.

Playing in Cincinnati at the Western & Southern Open, Knapp was defeated in the final round of qualifying by Kurumi Nara. At the US Open, Knapp lost in the first round to Johanna Larsson.

Knapp did not play any more tournaments for the rest of the season. She ended the year ranked 144.

2017
In Melbourne at the Australian Open, Knapp retired during her first-round match versus Hsieh Su-wei due to injury. This ended up being Knapp's final match of her career. In April, she married her partner and coach, Francesco Piccari.

2018
On 13 May 2018, Knapp retired from tennis due to a chronic right knee injury.

Performance timelines
Only main-draw results in WTA Tour, Grand Slam tournaments, Fed Cup and Olympic Games are included in win–loss records.

Singles

Doubles

WTA career finals

Singles: 4 (2 titles, 2 runner-ups)

Doubles: 3 (3 runner-ups)

ITF Circuit finals

Singles: 19 (6 titles, 13 runner-ups)

Doubles: 7 (6 titles, 1 runner-up)

Top 10 wins

Notes

References

External links
 
 
 

1987 births
Living people
Sportspeople from Bruneck
Italian female tennis players
Germanophone Italian people
Italian people of Austrian descent
Olympic tennis players of Italy
Tennis players at the 2016 Summer Olympics